Alicja Dorabialska (14 October 1897 – 1975), was a Polish chemist.

Life
Alicja Dorabialska was born in Sosnowiec, Vistula Land, Russian Empire (now Poland) on 14 October 1897. She graduated from a high school in Warsaw in 1914 and then enrolled in the Physical-Mathematical Department of the Moscow Higher Women's Courses the following year, graduating in 1918. Dorabialska received her Ph.D. from the University of Warsaw in 1922 and studied under Marie Curie at the Radium Institute, Paris in 1925. Dorabialska was an assistant in the Institute of Physical Chemistry in Warsaw University of Technology from 1918 to 1932. Two years later she was appointed an assistant professor in the department of physical and inorganic chemistry of Lviv Polytechnic in 1934 and served as the department chair during World War II. In 1945 Dorabialska was promoted to full professor and served as dean of the chemistry department from 1945 to 1951. She was also chair of the department from 1945 to 1968. She died in 1975.

Activities
Dorabialska wrote her dissertation on thermochemical investigations on stereoisomerism in ketones under the supervision of Wojciech Świętosławski.

Notes

References

1897 births
1975 deaths
Polish chemists
Polish women chemists
People from Sosnowiec
People from Piotrków Governorate